Gomphidia kodaguensis is a species of dragonfly in the family Gomphidae. It is known only from the Western Ghats of India.

Description and habitat
It is a large dragonfly with bottle-green eyes. Its thorax black, marked with yellow. There are two broad and oval greenish-yellow dorsal stripes, pointed below and not nearly meeting the meso-thoracic collar. There are two broad yellow stripes separated by a broad black stripe on each side. Abdomen is black, marked with yellow. Segment 1 has a fine apical dorsal ring. Segment 2 has a small oval dorsal spot on the basal two-thirds. Segment 3 to 6 have dorsal basal spots. Segment 7 has the basal half yellow. Segment 8 has a long transverse basal spot. Segment 9 is unmarked. Segment 10 has a dorsal spot covering the entire dorsum. Anal appendages are black. Female is similar to the male.

It is commonly found in streams and rivers in hilly and mountainous areas.

See also
 List of odonates of India
 List of odonata of Kerala

References

Gomphidae
Taxa named by Frederic Charles Fraser
Insects described in 1923